The Straw Hat  (translit. Solomennaya shlyapka) is a 1974 Soviet musical comedy television film directed by Leonid Kvinikhidze based on a play by Eugène Marin Labiche and Marc-Michel. The film's music was composed by Isaac Schwartz.

Plot summary
The extravagant life of a charming rentier who thought nothing of consequences. But living on credit finally wakes him up, forcing to end his bachelor's life by marrying the daughter of a wealthy earl for her money. All goes well until a horse eats a certain straw hat, triggering a series of farcical vents interwoven with the marriage.

Cast
 Andrei Mironov - Leonidas Fadinard
 Vladislav Strzhelchik - Antoine  Nonancourt
 Zinovi Gerdt - Tardiveau
 Yefim Kopelyan - Beauperthuis
 Lyudmila Gurchenko - Bocardon
 Yekaterina Vasilyeva - Anaïs Beaupertuis
 Alisa Freindlich - La baronne de Champigny
 Mikhail Kozakov - Achille de Rosalba
 Igor Kvasha - Émile Tavernier
 Aleksandr Benyaminov - Vezinet
 Vladimir Tatosov - Félix
 Irina Maguto - Virginie
 Marina Starykh - Hélène
 Sergey Migitsko - Bobin
 Mikhail Boyarsky - Ninardi
 Yevgenia Vetlova - minstrel
 Alexander Kolpashnikov - minstrel

Songs from the film 
 Intro song ("We actors, minstrels, bards and poets...")
 Song about the straw hat
 I'm getting married, I'm getting married...
 The song of a retired Musketeer
 Song about broken hopes
 The song of the Parisian waiter
 A song about a provincial town ("Our town isn't worse than Paris...")
 National Guards March
 Romance ("I remember a wonderful country...")
 Lover's song ("Connection of the hearts...")
 Final song (Rest in peace, Eugène Labiche...)
See Sonkino.ru for the text of the songs

Production 
The idea of the film appeared to Leonid Kvinikhidze immediately after the filming of the film "Failure of Engineer Garin". Initially, Oleg Borisov was considered for the main role, but he needed urgent treatment, and Andrei Mironov received the role (Lyudmila Gurchenko later recalled: "We gathered to frame the brilliant Andrew, and we did it"). Nonna Terentyeva was originally invited to play the role of Clara, but Gurchenko turned out to be more convincing at the auditions. In the episodic role of a simple lamplighter, the playwright Mikhail Roshchin appears, who then had an affair with Ekaterina Vasilyeva, who starred in the film. Alisa Freindlich, known to the audience only for her dramatic roles, appeared in the cinema for the first time in a comedic image. Andrey Mironov learned to stay in the saddle right during the filming.

The film became the first notable role for Mikhail Boyarsky: "The tenacious eye of the directors figured me out as a certain artist "young, like an Italian." I was hairy, somewhat like an Italian, and in general I didn't spoil the picture." The actor spoke highly of Alisa Freindlich, who helped him with valuable advices: "Behind her fan, you could hide any aspiring artist".

There was a relaxed atmosphere on the set: the actors played each other, indulged in small playful escapades. Kvinikhidze, who appreciated improvisations, ordered not to turn off the camera, no matter what happened. As a result, the film included a lot of episodes that were not in the script — for example, scenes when a wig falls off the hero of Mikhail Kozakov during a duel, or when Mironov kisses Freindlich in the presence of Boyarsky. Kozakov approached the image of the Vicomte de Rosalba with a certain freedom, creating the image of a dandy with an uncertain sexual orientation; hearing the actor's remark about "a meadow with cows and a shepherd boy", Mironov laughed: "You're crazy! They will close everything to hell!", but the scene was included in the film. Alexander Beniaminov (Uncle Vezine) could not remember the author's text and constantly improvised.

Filming was conducted in Tartu and in St. Petersburg.

References

External links
 
  on 5TV. In Russian
  on 5TV. In Russian

1974 films
Soviet musical comedy films
1970s musical comedy films
Lenfilm films
1970s Russian-language films
Soviet films based on plays
1974 comedy films
Soviet television films